The Nuclear Safeguards Act 2018 (c. 15) is an Act of the Parliament of the United Kingdom that makes legal provision to enable the continuation of nuclear safeguards after the United Kingdom's withdrawal from the European Atomic Energy Community as part the implementation of the country's exit from the European Union (Brexit).

The Act received Royal Assent on 26 June 2018, coincidentally on the same day as the European Union (Withdrawal) Act 2018 to which it contains several references.

See also
Brexit

References 

Brexit
Consequences of the 2016 United Kingdom European Union membership referendum
United Kingdom Acts of Parliament 2018